Andrea Pallaoro is an Italian film director and screenwriter. Hannah, his second feature and the first of an intended trilogy of films centering on a female lead, premiered at the 74th Venice Film Festival and proceeded to win numerous awards including the Coppa Volpi for Charlotte Rampling, who performed as the leading character, the award for Best Cinematography at the 53rd Chicago International Film Festival, and a César Nomination for best foreign film.

His film feature film debut, Medeas, premiered at the 70th annual Venice Film Festival. Pallaoro won numerous international awards including Best Director at The Marrakech Film Festival, the Sergej Parajanov Award for Outstanding Poetic Vision at the Tbilisi International Film Festival, and the New Voices/New Visions Award at the Palm Springs International Film Festival. Chayse Irvin received the award for best cinematographer's debut for Medeas at Camerimage, the international film festival of the art of cinematography.

His short film Wunderkammer won six international awards and has been selected in the official competition of over fifty film festivals around the world including Sundance.

Pallaoro holds an MFA in Film Directing from the California Institute of the Arts and a BA from Hampshire College.

In 2013 and 2015 he was awarded a Yaddo Residency and is the recipient of the 2017 Jerome Foundation Filmmaking Grant. He has served in the jury of multiple international film festivals including the 75th Venice Film Festival, the Chicago International Film Festival, the Black Nights Tallinn International Film Festival and the Biografilm International Film festival.

Early life 
He was born in Trento, Italy.

Personal life 
Andrea lives between Los Angeles and New York.

Filmography

References

External links

1982 births
Living people
Italian film directors
Italian screenwriters
Italian male screenwriters
California Institute of the Arts alumni
Hampshire College alumni
People from Trento